Spring Grove is the north-western district of the town of Isleworth within the Borough of Hounslow in London, England.  In general terms it lies east of the district of Lampton; north of the district of Woodlands; west of the Barnes-to-Feltham railway loop line; and south of the district of Osterley. Spring water that rose in the area in the eighteenth century was employed for agricultural and horticultural purposes.

The prime purpose of Spring Grove in recent centuries appears to have been the gradual provision of residential areas for middle-class communities. Georgian residences appeared first, with large plots of land. With the railway service (Isleworth railway station was formerly called 'Spring Grove & Isleworth') came substantial Victorian property development. During the twentieth century further residential development occurred, and with the turn of the twenty-first century, some of the large villas gave way to modern development of various forms.

The district has over the course of a century or so also embraced a number of large educational establishments, including Brunel University London and West Thames College.

References

Further reading 
 History of Spring Grove, Spring Grove Residents' Association

Areas of London
Districts of the London Borough of Hounslow
Isleworth